Donal Kavanagh (born 1950 in Killarney, County Kerry) is an Irish former sportsperson. He played Gaelic football with his local club Dr. Crokes and was a member of the Kerry senior inter-county team from 1972 until 1973.

References

1950 births
Living people
Dr Crokes Gaelic footballers
Kerry inter-county Gaelic footballers